Vasyl Shtander (born 2 June 1996 in Shatsk, Volyn Oblast, Ukraine) is a Ukrainian football midfielder who played for FC Illichivets-2 Mariupol in the Ukrainian Second League.

Career
Shtander is a product of the BRW BIK Volodymyr-Volynskyi and FC Shakhtar Donetsk youth sportive schools and signed contract with FC Shakhtar Donetsk in the Ukrainian Premier League in 2013. He played for FC Shakhtar-3 Donetsk in the Ukrainian Second League and FC Shakhtar reserves team.

In September 2015 he signed on loan contract with FC Hirnyk-Sport Komsomolsk from the Ukrainian First League.

References

External links
Profile at Official FFU Site (Ukr)

Ukrainian footballers
FC Shakhtar-3 Donetsk players
Association football midfielders
1996 births
Living people
FC Hirnyk-Sport Horishni Plavni players
FC Guria Lanchkhuti players
Ukrainian expatriate footballers
Expatriate footballers in Georgia (country)
Ukrainian expatriate sportspeople in Georgia (country)
FC Illichivets-2 Mariupol players
Sportspeople from Volyn Oblast